GoodWill & MGI are an American/Finnish production and songwriting duo consisting of William "GoodWill" Rappaport and Henri "MGI" Lanz.  Formed in 2006, GoodWill & MGI have since been producing and writing with numerous major label artists and writers in the US, Europe, and Asia, including Pitbull, Akon, Justin Bieber, Inna, Kylie Minogue, Super Junior, EXO, 50 Cent, and Twista. Additionally, since 2011 they have been developing and breaking artists independently, including Radical Something.

In December 2013,  they also inked their first joint venture label deal with Universal Scandinavia,  which includes gold and platinum Scandinavian artists Nikke Ankara and Evelina among others.

Selected discography 

Record production duos
Songwriting teams